Lynn (previously also known as Benzler) is an unincorporated community in Pleasant Township, Marion County, Ohio, United States.

History
The Benzler Post Office was established on December 9, 1897, but was discontinued on February 15, 1905. In 1905, the Lynn Railroad Station was located here, on the Pennsylvania Railroad, but the community was still called Benzler. The station was discontinued on April 1, 1921.

References

Unincorporated communities in Marion County, Ohio